Farès Fellahi (born 13 May 1975 in Sétif) is an Algerian former football player.

He was part of the Algerian 2004 African Nations Cup team, who finished second in their group in the first round of competition before being defeated by Morocco in the quarter-finals.

National team statistics

International goals
Scores and results list Algeria's goal tally first.

Honours
 Finished as top scorer of the Algerian Second Division in 2007/2008 with 24 goals for MC El Eulma
 Has 8 caps and 2 goals for the Algerian National Team

References

1975 births
Living people
Footballers from Sétif
Algerian footballers
Algeria international footballers
Algerian Ligue 2 players
MSP Batna players
MC El Eulma players
NA Hussein Dey players
ES Sétif players
MC Alger players
CA Batna players
MO Constantine players
2004 African Cup of Nations players
USM Sétif players
Association football forwards
21st-century Algerian people